Inglewood is a small town near Adelaide, South Australia. It is located in the Adelaide Hills Council local government area, and is adjacent to Houghton, Paracombe and the rural districts of Upper Hermitage and Chain of Ponds. At the 2006 census, Inglewood had a population of 264.

Inglewood began as a private subdivision, and was named after a town in Cumberland, England. The historic Inglewood Inn on North East Road was built by Thomas Deacon in 1858, and played a significant role in the development of the area. It survives today and is listed on the South Australian Heritage Register and the former Register of the National Estate. Inglewood Post Office opened in July 1865. The town also has a general store, located on North East Road.

The modern boundaries of Inglewood were established in October 2001 for the long established name. Its boundaries with Lower Hermitage were altered in October 2005 and it gained an area from Millbrook in August 2015.

Transport
The area is not serviced by Adelaide public transport. A coach is operated from Tea Tree Plaza Interchange to Gumeracha and Mount Pleasant by Link SA.

References 

Suburbs of Adelaide
Towns in South Australia